Andreyevka is a rural locality (a selo) in Yamadinsky Selsoviet, Yanaulsky District, Bashkortostan, Russia. The population was 357 as of 2010.

Geography 
It is located 37 km from Yanaul, 3 km from Yamady.

References 

Rural localities in Yanaulsky District